Frankenstein's Great Aunt Tillie is a 1984 comedy film about Frankenstein that is based in Transylvania.

June Wilkinson, who had a part in the film, was interviewed in the book Screen Sirens Scream! about her role. The film's music was written about in the book Musique fantastique.

Plot
Castle Frankenstein has been empty for years and the local council is planning to repossess it, when the Frankenstein family return, seeking to find hidden treasure, and to re-animate the Frankenstein monster.

Cast
Victor Frankenstein / Old Baron Frankenstein - Donald Pleasence	
Matilda 'Tillie' Frankenstein - Yvonne Furneaux	
Randy - June Wilkinson	
The Monster -  Miguel Angel Fuentes		
Bürgermeister - Aldo Ray	
Clara - Zsa Zsa Gabor	
Grocer Schnitt - Rod Colbin	
Police Superintendent Schwerbaum - Chandler Garrison	
Banker Schlockmocker - Phil Leeds	
Lawyer Schnabel - Garnett Smith	
Judge Edelweiss - Ken Smith	
Secretary Gudrun Geduldig - Karen Haber	
Feldwebel Erstarren - Edgar Vivar	
Big Black Bill (as Borolas) - Joaquín García Vargas

Critical reception
The Bloody Pit of Horror wrote, "I literally cringe at the thought of ever stumbling across something as bad as this in the future. To make it worse, the damn thing goes on forever."

External links

References

1984 films
1980s comedy horror films
American comedy horror films
Frankenstein films
Films set in castles
Films set in Transylvania
Films scored by Ronald Stein
1984 comedy films
1980s English-language films
1980s American films